Pearl T. Robinson (born 1945) is an American professor of political science at Tufts University. She has written dozens of books and articles on Africa and African Americans, including co-authoring and co-editing the book, Transformation and Resiliency in Africa, with her co-editor Elliott Skinner. She was president of the African Studies Association from 2007–2008, and is a member of the Council on Foreign Relations. Her chapter Area Studies in Search of Africa from The Politics of Knowledge: Area Studies and the Disciplines was included in 4th edition of The African Studies Companion.

References

Tufts University faculty
American women political scientists
American political scientists
1945 births
Living people
Black studies scholars
Columbia University alumni
People from New Orleans
University of California, Davis alumni
American women academics
21st-century American women
Presidents of the African Studies Association